Sopó is a municipality and town of Colombia in the department of Cundinamarca. The town is located 39 km north of the Colombian capital Bogotá.

History 
The area of Sopó was inhabited first by indigenous groups during the Herrera Period and later the Muisca before the arrival of the Spanish in 1537. It was part of the zipazgo ruled from Bacatá.

In the coat of arms of the town in the lower left quadrant a Muisca pattern can be seen.

Borders 
North: Zipaquirá and Tocancipá
South: La Calera
East: Guasca
West: Cajicá and Chía.

Economy 
The major economical activity in Sopó is agriculture and especially dairy. The third largest Colombian dairy company Alpina was founded in Sopó in 1945.

Gallery

References 

Municipalities of Cundinamarca Department
Populated places established in 1653
1653 establishments in the Spanish Empire
Muisca Confederation